Girls Leadership Academy of Arizona is an all-girls public charter high school in central Phoenix, Arizona. It is the second all-girls, non-boarding school in the state (the other is private Xavier College Preparatory) and the first public all-girls school in the state. Its facility is shared with the Florence Crittenton of Arizona nonprofit.

The school has an agreement with Phoenix College to allow students to take college courses in high school.

It is a member of the Canyon Athletic Association.

References

Public high schools in Arizona
Charter schools in Arizona
Schools in Phoenix, Arizona
Women in Arizona